Siuntio railway station is a railway station in the municipality of Siuntio, Finland, between the stations of Kirkkonummi and Karis.

History 
The Sjundeå station was opened for traffic on 1 September 1903, and its station building, designed by Bruno Granholm, was finished in the same year. The station had its Finnish name officialized in June 1925.

The station was on the area of the territory of the Soviet Porkkala Naval Base, established as a result of the Moscow Armistice in 1944. As Porkkala was returned to Finnish control in 1956, Siuntio was re-established first as a halt on 1 May 1956; it was upgraded to a staffed laiturivaihde — a halt with a railyard with at least one switch — just one month later after the renovation of the station building was completed.

Services 

The station is part of HSL fare zone .

See also 
 Railway lines in Finland

References

External links
 
 Train arrivals and departures at Siuntio on Finrail

Railway stations designed by Bruno Granholm
Railway stations in Uusimaa
Railway stations opened in 1899
Siuntio